Idaho Proposition 1 may refer to:

 1994 Idaho Proposition 1, regarding gay rights
 2018 Idaho Proposition 1, regarding horse racing